Chiari is a railway station serving the town of Chiari, in the region of Lombardy, northern Italy. The station opened in 1878 and is located on the Milan–Venice railway. The train services are operated by Trenord.

History
Between 1898 and 1915 the station was the southern terminus of the Iseo-Rovato-Chiari tramway.

Train services
The station is served by the following service(s):

Express services (Treno regionale) Milan - Treviglio - Brescia - Verona
Regional services (Treno regionale) Sesto San Giovanni - Milan - Treviglio - Brescia

See also

History of rail transport in Italy
List of railway stations in Lombardy
Rail transport in Italy
Railway stations in Italy

References

 This article is based upon a translation of the Italian language version as of January 2016.

External links

Railway stations in Lombardy
Railway stations opened in 1878
1878 establishments in Italy
Buildings and structures in the Province of Brescia
Railway stations in Italy opened in the 19th century